Pal Do Pal is a 1999 Pakistani romantic action film, which was directed by Shamim Ara.

This film starred Moammar Rana, Resham, Saud, Meera, Ismail Tara, Nayyar Ejaz and Shafqat Cheema in pivotal roles. The film is also notable for being the only Pakistani movie to have music by legendary Nusrat Fateh Ali Khan.

Plot 
The film follows the love story of central characters—Gul (Moammar) and Khushboo (Resham) who eagerly love each other, but face numerous hurdles in their journey of uniting with each other. As both belongs to different tribes, their families are not accepting their relationship, although Gul's cousin Ayaz (Saud) supports them. Ayaz's mother Muqaddas (Deeba), is actually the paternal aunt of Khushboo, but Khushboo's father Jahangir Khan broke all relations with her. Jahangir's step-brother Wazir Khan (Nayyar Ejaz) and his son Badshah (Shafqat Cheema) also conspires against Gul and Khushboo, as Badshah wants to capture all the property of Jahangir Khan, and that is possible only if Khushboo agrees to marry him. Will Gul and Khushboo be able to unite?

Cast 
 Moammar Rana as Gul
 Resham as Khushboo
 Saud as Ayaz
 Deeba as Muqaddas (Ayaz and Gul's mother)
 Shafqat Cheema as Badshah Khan
 Meera as Ruby
 Nayyar Ejaz as Wazir Khan
 Ghulam Mohiuddin as Mukarram Khan

Release 
The film was released on 5 November 1999 across Pakistan.

References

External links
Pal Do Pal (1999 film) on YouTube

Pakistani action films
1999 films
Pakistani romance films
1990s Urdu-language films
1990s romantic action films
Urdu-language Pakistani films